Oldenburg Hauptbahnhof (originally Oldenburg Centralbahnhof) is the main passenger station in the city of Oldenburg in the German state of Lower Saxony. It is a through station, with seven platform tracks. Its large reception hall was built in the Art Nouveau style.

It is one of two stations in Oldenburg open to passengers, the other one being the newly-constructed Oldenburg-Wechloy suburban rail station opened in 2015 in the vicinity of the University of Oldenburg. Older stations, including Ofenerdiek and Osternburg, have had their passenger service gradually removed over the course of previous decades.

History 

The first railway in the capital of the Grand Duchy of Oldenburg was the line from Oldenburg to Bremen via Delmenhorst opened by the Grand Duchy of Oldenburg State Railways on 15 July 1867. On 3 September 1867, a line was opened from Oldenburg to Heppens (later renamed Wilhelmshaven), financed by the Prussian government. The line was operated by the Oldenburg State Railways, which in 1913 bought the line from Prussia, placing an enormous burden on the state's budget. On 15 June 1869, the Oldenburg–Leer line was opened. On 15 October 1875, the Oldenburg State Railways opened the Oldenburg–Osnabrück line.

The first Oldenburg station was planned to be built in today's Cäcilienplatz. In 1868, it became clear that the proposed building would be too small for the growing demand. Therefore, the project was never realized. Instead, a converted freight shed served as Oldenburg's station for twelve years.

On 21 May 1879, the Central Station was finally inaugurated as the first "real" station in Oldenburg  at the site of the present station. It was a neo-Gothic building designed by the renowned architect Conrad Wilhelm Hase. It was considered one of the most romantic railway buildings in Germany.

Today's Oldenburg station was inaugurated on 3 August 1915 without much ceremony after four years of construction. The magnificent Art Nouveau building was designed by the architect, Friedrich Mettegang. A separate building was planned for the Grand Duke of Oldenburg to board trains, called Prince Hall. As part of the new building the tracks were raised by about 3.25 meters. The building was placed at the edge of the tracks, so that the station could be rebuilt as a through station. Up to that time, travellers who wanted to continue past Oldenburg had to change trains. 
In 1992 the line was electrified from Oldenburg to Leer.

Connections

The station's track 1 is next to the main building and it has three Island platforms, numbered as tracks 3/4, 5/6 and 7/8. Track 2 is a through track without a platform.

Train services
The following services currently call at the station:

Intercity Express services (ICE 10) Oldenburg - Bremen - Hanover - Wolfsburg - Berlin
Intercity Express services (ICE 22) Oldenburg - Bremen - Hanover - Kassel - Frankfurt
Intercity Express services (ICE 25) Oldenburg - Bremen - Hanover - Kassel - Würzburg – Nürnberg – Ingolstadt – Munich
Intercity services (IC 56) Norddeich - Emden - Oldenburg - Bremen - Hanover - Braunschweig - Magdeburg - Leipzig / Berlin - Cottbus
Regional services  Norddeich - Emden - Oldenburg - Bremen - Nienburg - Hanover
Regional services  Wilhelmshaven - Varel - Oldenburg - Cloppenburg - Bramsche - Osnabrück
Bremen S-Bahn services  Bad Zwischenahn - Oldenburg - Delmerhorst - Bremen

The main long-distance service through Oldenburg is an InterCity service operating at two-hour intervals to Leipzig via Hanover. In addition, Intercity-Express trains operate once a day on several routes.

References

External links
 
 Track plan of Oldenburg (Oldenburg) Hbf from Deutschen Bahn site (PDF; 177,3 KB)
 Images of the old Centralbahnhof

Railway stations in Germany opened in 1879
Railway stations in Lower Saxony
Hauptbahnhof
Art Nouveau architecture in Germany
Art Nouveau railway stations
Railway stations in Germany opened in 1915
Hauptbahnhof
Bremen S-Bahn